The Grange may refer to:

Places

Australia
 Grange, Queensland, a suburb of Brisbane, Queensland, often referred to as The Grange
 The Grange, home of Charles Sturt in Grange, South Australia
 The Grange, Windsor, a heritage-listed house in Brisbane, Queensland

Canada
 The Grange, Edmonton, a neighbourhood in the city of Edmonton, Canada
 The Grange (Toronto), a section of the Art Gallery of Ontario

United Kingdom
 The Grange, Beeston, a Grade II listed building in Nottinghamshire
 The Grange, Chalfont St Peter, a former country house in Buckinghamshire
 The Grange, Edinburgh, a residential suburb of Edinburgh, Scotland
 The Grange (Kensington), a former military installation in Liverpool
 The Grange, Monmouth, three attached Grade II listed buildings in Monmouthshire, Wales
 The Grange, Northington, a 19th-century country house in Hampshire
 The Grange, Ramsgate, a 19th-century house in Kent, designed by architect Augustus Pugin as his home
 The Grange Club, a cricket ground in the Stockbridge district of Edinburgh, Scotland

United States
 The Grange (Lincoln, Massachusetts), an 18th-century home, also called Codman House
 The Grange (New York City), a national memorial site and former home of Alexander Hamilton
 The Grange (Paris, Kentucky), an 18th-century home built for slave trader Ned Stone

Organizations 
 National Grange of the Order of Patrons of Husbandry ("The Grange"), an agricultural and social organization in the United States

See also
 Grange (as used without the definite article, "the")